Glyphodes canthusalis is a moth in the family Crambidae. It was described by Francis Walker in 1859. It is found in Taiwan, mainland India, Sri Lanka and on the Andaman Islands, Vietnam, Indonesia (Sumatra, Java) and Australia (Queensland and New South Wales).

The wingspan is about 30 mm. The wings have a pattern of brown filigree surrounding white patches.

References

Moths described in 1859
Glyphodes